"The Hunted" is a song by Canadian-American rock supergroup Saint Asonia. It was released on July 24, 2019 as the lead single from their second studio album Flawed Design. The song features Sully Erna, the lead singer from American rock band Godsmack.

Background and composition
The band teased the song on July 17, 2019 which features a guest appearance by Godsmack frontman, Sully Erna. They recorded the song with producer Brian Sperber in New York earlier that year. Lead singer Adam Gontier spoke about the meaning behind the song stating, "'The Hunted' is a song about struggling to find your place in life." Guitarist Mike Mushok added, "I think that having 'The Hunted' as our first single is a great representation of where the band is going." The track runs at 100 BPM and is in the key of D minor.

Music video
The band previewed the music video through a new Snapchat Lens which puts fans right into the video's key scene. The video for "The Hunted" was released on September 23, 2019 and was directed by P.R. Brown. Gontier spoke about the music video:

As of October 2022, the music video for "The Hunted" has over 1 million views on YouTube.

Credits and personnel
 Adam Gontier – lead vocals, rhythm guitar
 Mike Mushok – lead guitar
 Cale Gontier – bass
 Sal Giancarelli – drums
 Brian Sperber – producer

Charts

Weekly charts

Year-end charts

Release history

References

2019 songs
2019 singles
Songs written by Adam Gontier
Songs written by Sully Erna
Saint Asonia songs